Shatter Me is a young adult dystopian thriller written by Tahereh Mafi, published on November 15, 2011. The book is narrated by Juliette, a 17-year-old girl with a lethal touch and is unusual in that it contains passages and lines that have been crossed out like a diary entry. Shatter Me is the first of a series of six books. The second book in the series, Unravel Me, was published on February 5, 2013. The third book, Ignite Me, was published on February 4, 2014. The fourth book, Restore Me, was published on March 6, 2018. The fifth book, Defy Me, was published on April 2, 2019. The sixth book , Imagine Me, was published on March 31, 2020. The seventh and final book, Believe Me, was published on November 11, 2021.

Of her inspirations for the work, Mafi has stated that she drew inspiration from "an interest in human nature and [humanity's] ability to overcome great obstacles".

Plot
Juliette Ferrars is a 17-year-old girl whose touch paralyzes and kills, taking living organisms' energy. Juliette is in an asylum because three years prior, she killed a small boy in a store with her unusual touch. It is evident that Juliette is partly insane, both from prolonged isolation and at horror at herself. She repeatedly dreams of a bird and writes in a small notebook.

Suddenly, for the first time ever, Juliette gets a cellmate who goes by the name of Adam Kent. He reminds Juliette of someone, but she convinces herself that it is not possible that she ever knew him. She shows Adam the ways of the asylum, such as not to eat the scalding food immediately, and when the asylum's occupants are allowed to shower.

One day, the Reestablishment, a government that has the world within its grasp, comes for Juliette. It is revealed that Adam is a soldier for Aaron Warner, the leader of Sector 45 of the Reestablishment. Warner, who is also the son of the Reestablishment's Supreme Commander, makes Juliette an offer that includes her being able to get out of the asylum in turn for her torturing any prisoners with her touch as a weapon for the Reestablishment.

Warner wants to feel the full effects of Juliette's power, but she refuses to touch or  hurt him, so he forces her  to torture a soldier named Jenkins and a small child through a simulated torture room.  During her captivity, Juliette develops a romantic relationship with Adam. It is revealed that Adam knew Juliette prior to the asylum, and is in love with her, and that he can touch Juliette without being harmed or killed. Adam eventually helps Juliette escape from Warner, and as they escape, Warner's hand brushes against Juliette's ankle, revealing that Warner also can touch Juliette without consequence.

Adam and Juliette run away to where Adam's 10-year-old brother James lives, a small apartment Adam helped to make. James is taken care of by others because Adam must live with the other soldiers; to the brother's knowledge, both of their parents are dead. Through spending time together, Adam starts to become possessive of Juliette. One of Adam's fellow soldiers, Kenji Kishimoto, shows up claiming that Warner had him tortured in order to learn Adam and Juliette's whereabouts. Kenji says that he knows a safe place where they can escape, and they formulate a plan. Juliette and Adam split up with Kenji and James, but Adam and Juliette are captured and Warner shoots Adam.

Warner drags Juliette into an abandoned classroom and tells Juliette he loves her. Warner kisses Juliette, so she seduces him to get the gun from him. She non-fatally shoots him. She finds Adam in a slaughterhouse, and they escape, although Adams's leg is badly injured. They meet up with Kenji and James, whom Kenji has given sedatives so that he will not be traumatized by the condition Adam is in.

It is revealed that Kenji is a member of the Rebellion against the Reestablishment, called Omega Point. Adam, Juliette, and James are recruited by, and then join the Rebellion.

Reception
Reviews for Shatter Me have been mixed, with many reviewers stating criticisms while overall recommending the work. Kirkus Reviews praised Shatter Me for its love story, but said that the ending "falls flat" and that there was an "overreliance on metaphor". Publishers Weekly cited that while the book "doesn’t escape some rookie pitfalls," author Tahereh Mafi "combines a psychological opener with an action-adventure denouement in her YA debut," ultimately calling it "a gripping read from an author who’s not afraid to take risks". Booklist gave a mixed review, noting that there were "plot conveniences and melodramatic writing to spare" while praising it for its "rip-roaring adventure and steamy romance scenes".

A youth reviewer for the National Post recommended it highly, stating that it had "just the right amount of action to make it thrilling, but not exactly gruesome." It was included in BuzzFeed's list of best YA books of all time.

Awards
Honorable Mention: Children/Young Adult at the Arab American Book Awards

Characters
Juliette Ferrars: Juliette starts off as a scared, traumatized 17-year-old girl, having been abused, locked away, and made to feel like a monster her entire life. She struggles to trust others and has trouble making friends, due to her lethal touch. Throughout the series, she learns to control her powers and becomes more brave and confident thanks to the help of training at Omega Point. Despite being friendless for most of her life, Juliette is compassionate and kind, and easily sympathizes with those who are vulnerable. Juliette can also easily be influenced and manipulated and has fluctuating confidence. 
Aaron Warner: 19-year-old leader of Sector 45 in the Reestablishment, 6'2; shown as a very cold and manipulative person. Warner gradually changes into a more loving human being as the books progress. He has blond hair and green eyes and is considered inhumanly handsome. From the beginning of the series, he is desperately in love with Juliette, which for a while was an obsession. Juliette develops empathy for Warner, despite him seeming cold and ruthless, and asserts him as a normal human, despite his denials. He is known to always assume the worst of himself. He can touch Juliette without consequence.
Kenji Kishimoto: A 20-year-old soldier in Warner's army who is friends with Adam. He is later found out to be a member of Omega Point and is shown to have the gift of invisibility. He has a very joking personality and is a very chill person. He is also very egotistical and that adds humor to his person. He is also known to develop an admiration for Juliette which she returns and they form a strong bond, as best friends, almost like siblings.
James Kent: Adam's 10-year-old younger brother. He is extremely mature for his age. He is very intuitive and curious to the world around him. He greatly admires Aaron. 
Castle: Leader of the Rebellion (Omega Point). Castle is a thirty-year-old scientist with telekinetic powers. He is portrayed as a wise, fair and compassionate person. He is highly knowledgeable and is the first one who accepts Juliette as she joins the Rebellion, although he keeps many secrets about her true identity from her.
Adam Kent: A soldier in the army, 18 years old; he is in charge of Juliette after she is brought out of isolation. He is known as an average man with blue eyes, tattoos, around 6'1", and dark brown hair. He is shown to be in love with Juliette since they first saw/met each other, as children. He can touch Juliette by using his powers but it is extremely draining and sometimes painful for him.

Sequels

Series list:

1. Shatter Me

1.5. Destroy Me

2. Unravel Me

2.5. Fracture Me

3. Ignite Me

4. Restore Me

4.5. Shadow Me

5. Defy Me

5.5. Reveal Me

6. Imagine Me

6.5. Believe Me

Shatter Me is the first in its series. An e-book novella titled Destroy Me, set after Shatter Me and before the sequel, Unravel Me, told from Warner's point of view, was released on October 6, 2012. Unravel Me, the second book in the series, was released on February 5, 2013. A second e-book novella titled Fracture Me, set during and soon after the final moments of Unravel Me, told from Adam's point of view, was released December 17, 2013. The third book in the series, titled Ignite Me, was released on February 4, 2014. On the same day, Unite Me, containing the two novellas combined into print for the first time as well as an exclusive look into Juliette’s journal, was also released.

In April 2017, it was announced that Mafi would be releasing three more books in the Shatter Me series starting with Restore Me, which was published on March 6, 2018. A novella entitled Shadow Me, told from Kenji's perspective, was released on March 5, 2019. A month later, the fifth book in the series, Defy Me, was released. The sixth and final main installment of Shatter Me, titled "Imagine Me", was released on March 31, 2020.

“Believe Me”, a fifth novella written from Warner’s point of view, is set to be released on November 16, 2021.

Unite Me: A compilation of the first and second novellas, Destroy Me and Fracture Me.

Find Me: A compilation of the third and fourth novellas, Shadow Me and Reveal Me.

Film adaptation
Paramount Pictures announced that they will distribute the film rights of the books.

Film rights for Shatter Me were optioned by 20th Century Fox in 2011, prior to the book's release date.

References

External links
Official author site
Official publisher page 
Youtube video of Mafi discussing the book

2011 American novels
American post-apocalyptic novels
American science fiction novels
American young adult novels
Children's science fiction novels
Dystopian novels
Arab-American novels
HarperCollins books